The 2021 Saudi Arabian Grand Prix (officially known as the Formula 1 STC Saudi Arabian Grand Prix 2021) was a Formula One motor race, held on 5 December 2021 at the Jeddah Corniche Circuit, in Saudi Arabia. The inaugural Saudi Arabian Grand Prix, it was the 21st round of the 2021 Formula One World Championship.

Mercedes driver Lewis Hamilton won the race ahead of Red Bull driver Max Verstappen, while Mercedes's Valtteri Bottas edged out Alpine's Esteban Ocon for third by 0.102 seconds.

Background 

The Saudi Arabian Grand Prix was announced to be on the 2021 Formula One World Championship calendar in November 2020. The race was originally to take place on 28 November, but it was rescheduled due to the postponement of the Australian Grand Prix owing to the COVID-19 pandemic.

On 28 November, one week before the race, Williams co-founder and former owner Sir Frank Williams died at the age of 79. Teams sported tributes on their cars, and a minute's silence took place approximately one hour before the start of the race. On Sunday, former Williams driver Damon Hill did a lap of honour in the FW07, Williams's first championship winning car. Alpine ran a special livery for the weekend to commemorate their 100th race with one of their sponsors Castrol. On the eve of the race weekend, Williams CEO Jost Capito announced that he was tested positive for coronavirus, therefore missing the weekend with the team.

Championship standings before the race
Max Verstappen was the Drivers' Championship leader with 8 points separating him and Lewis Hamilton, with 351.5 points and 343.5 points respectively. In the Constructors' Championship, Mercedes led Red Bull Racing by 5 points. Behind them, Ferrari in 3rd place led McLaren by 39.5 points.

Entrants 

The drivers and teams were the same as the season entry list with no additional stand-in drivers for the race or practice.

This race was the last Formula One race start for Nikita Mazepin, who withdrew from the final race of the season due to a positive COVID-19 test, and was replaced ahead of the 2022 season, due to the Russian invasion of Ukraine.

Tyre choices 
Sole tyre supplier Pirelli allocated the C2, C3, and C4 compounds of tyre to be used during this Grand Prix weekend.

Practice 
There were three practice sessions, each scheduled for one hour. The first two practice sessions took place on Friday 3 December at 16:30 and 20:00 local time (UTC+03:00) and the third practice session took place at 17:00 on 4 December.

Qualifying 
Qualifying took place on 4 December at 20:00 local time and lasted for one hour. Qualifying began with Sergio Pérez taking top spot of the first segment of qualifying (Q1) with a time of 1.28.021. The second segment (Q2) ended with Lewis Hamilton taking the top spot with a time of 1.27.712. Hamilton set this time on 8 lap old medium tyres giving him a strong tyre disadvantage for the race (when drivers in the top 10 have to start on the tyre with which they set their fastest Q2 time) compared to his title rival Max Verstappen who had 4 lap old medium tyres.

All cars who made it through Q2, qualified on the medium tyres apart from Lando Norris who ran the soft tyres. Carlos Sainz Jr. struggled with his Ferrari after spinning at turn 10 and brushing the wall with his rear wing, causing minor damage. On his final run in Q2, he had another loss of control, declaring the car was "undrivable" and being forced to back out of the attempt. Q3 began with Hamilton having a slide and aborting his opening attempt. Hamilton then set his pole lap of a 1.27.511. Max Verstappen was on his flying lap at the end of the session, setting the fastest time of the session in the first two sectors, whilst almost clipping the wall at the exit of turn 2. Coming into the final corner, he locked his front left tyre and after going wide and applying the throttle he lost control of the rear and hit the wall causing his suspension to break. This gave Hamilton pole, ahead of Valtteri Bottas and Verstappen.

Qualifying classification

Race 
The race started at 20:30 local time on 5 December and lasted for 50 laps. The race was interrupted with incidents that resulted in one safety car period, two red flags, and four virtual safety car periods.

On lap 10, Mick Schumacher lost control of his Haas and smashed into the barriers. This caused the safety car to be deployed, and both of the Mercedes to pit, demoting them to second and third. The race was then red flagged, which meant that Max Verstappen could change tyres and would lead the race.

After the first standing restart, Verstappen and Lewis Hamilton were involved in an incident where Verstappen overtook Hamilton off the race track, shortly before a crash involving Sergio Pérez, Charles Leclerc, Nikita Mazepin, and George Russell resulted in a second red flag period. This left the cars lined up with Verstappen in first, Esteban Ocon in second, and Hamilton in third. Initially, race director Michael Masi offered to re-order the cars with Verstappen and Ocon switching places but was later amended to offer to move Hamilton to second and Verstappen to third, which left the proposed order as Ocon, Hamilton, and Verstappen. This was proposed in lieu of an investigation into Verstappen overtaking Hamilton at the first standing restart, and was only offered to Red Bull Racing and not put to the other two teams involved in the changing on the restart order, Alpine (Ocon's team) and Mercedes (Hamilton's team). 

On lap 37, Verstappen made an illegal overtake on Hamilton. Verstappen was told to let Hamilton past by the stewards. He decided to slow down to a crawl before the upcoming DRS (drag reduction system) detection point, in order for Verstappen to be able to activate DRS and be back on the attack right away. Hamilton was not warned that Verstappen would let him pass and was surprised by Verstappen's sudden dramatic drop in speed, and failed to avoid running into the back of Verstappen, damaging Hamilton's front wing endplate and Verstappen's diffuser. Following the race, the stewards gave Verstappen a 10 second time penalty for the incident, which did not affect his second place, and gave two penalty points on Verstappen's super license.

On the last lap, Esteban Ocon was overtaken by Valtteri Bottas for third place.

Post-race 
As both Hamilton and Verstappen had collided together for the third race in the season, Hamilton heavily criticised Verstappen in the post-race interviews, accusing his title rival for being "over the limit" in both his driving and title defense. Verstappen meanwhile hit out at the sport following the incident and the post-race penalties applied to him, claiming F1 is "more about penalties than racing".

Red Bull team principal Christian Horner compared the actions of race director Masi to "like being at the local market", and added: "It felt like today the sport missed [Masi's predecessor] Charlie Whiting." Formula One chief Ross Brawn said that Masi dealt with the situation in a pragmatic way. Masi commented: "I wouldn't call it a deal, as from a race director's perspective I have no authority to instruct the teams to do anything in that situation. I can give them an offer, [I have] the ability to do that but the choice is theirs. The stewards are obviously empowered to give penalties, but I can give them my perspective. That's why I offered them the ability to give that position up."

Russell, who retired as a result of the accident at the first restart and is also the director of the Grand Prix Drivers' Association, called for changes to be made to the track for safety. Norris, who was initially running in the points but dropped out during the red flag periods before recovering to 10th, meanwhile slammed the red flag tyre change rules, calling for the "unfair" rule to be changed and cited previous races where he ended up in similar situations.

Race classification 

Notes
  – Includes one point for fastest lap.
  – Max Verstappen received a five-second time penalty for leaving the track and gaining an advantage. He also received a ten-second time penalty after the race for causing a collision with Lewis Hamilton. His final position was not affected by the penalties.
  – Yuki Tsunoda finished 13th, but received a five-second time penalty for causing a collision with Sebastian Vettel.

Championship standings after the race

Drivers' Championship standings

Constructors' Championship standings

 Note: Only the top five positions are included for both sets of standings.
 Competitors marked with an asterisk still had a mathematical chance of winning the Championship.
 Max Verstappen was ahead of Lewis Hamilton courtesy of having won more races (nine compared to eight).

See also 
 2021 Jeddah Formula 2 round

Notes

References

External links 

Saudi Arabia
Saudi Arabian Grand Prix
2021 in Saudi Arabian sport
Saudi Arabian Grand Prix
Formula One controversies